The Resident of Wallis and Futuna was the French colonial representative in Wallis and Futuna.

The post was created in 1887, after Wallis and Futuna become a French protectorate. It was abolished in 1961, after the status was changed to that of an overseas territory.

For French representatives in Wallis and Futuna since 1961, see: Administrator Superior of Wallis and Futuna.

List of residents (1887–1961)

See also
 Politics of Wallis and Futuna
 List of kings of Alo
 List of kings of Sigave
 List of kings of Uvea

External links
 

Wallis and Futuna
History of Wallis and Futuna
Residents of Wallis and Futuna